The  Jacksonville Sharks season was the third season for the franchise in the Arena Football League (AFL), coming off of their victory in ArenaBowl XXIV. The team was coached by Les Moss and played their home games at Jacksonville Veterans Memorial Arena. With a 10–8 record in the regular season, the Sharks won their third consecutive division championship. However, they were denied an opportunity at an ArenaBowl championship repeat when they were defeated 89–34 in the American Conference Championship game by the Philadelphia Soul.

Standings

Schedule

Regular season
The Sharks had a bye week in week 1 and began the season on the road in week 2 against the Kansas City Command on March 16. Their first home game was on March 24 against the Georgia Force. They traveled to Pittsburgh to face the Pittsburgh Power on July 20 in their final regular season game.

Playoffs

References

Jacksonville Sharks
Jacksonville Sharks seasons
Jack